The 1920–21 Illinois Fighting Illini men's basketball team represented the University of Illinois.

Regular season
The 1920–21 season began a new era for the Illinois Fighting Illini men's basketball team. New head coach Frank Winters was coming to the University of Illinois after five successful years as head coach of Rockford Central High School in Rockford, Illinois.  During his tenure in Rockford, he guided his Rabs teams to three round of 16 finishes, one quarterfinals finish and one team finished its season as state champions. Winters inherited a team whose best player, Chuck Carney, severely injured his knee in the last football game. The team went on to an overall record of 11–7.  The Big Ten record for the Illini, at the conclusion of the 1920–21 season was seven wins five losses and a tie for fourth place. The starting lineup included All-American Chuck Carney, Laurie Walquist and Norton Hellstrom at forward, Henry Reitsch at center, and Charles Vail, John Sabo and Walter Collins as guards.

Roster

Source

Schedule
										
Source					
										

|-	
!colspan=12 style="background:#DF4E38; color:white;"| Non-Conference regular season
|- align="center" bgcolor=""

			

|-	
!colspan=9 style="background:#DF4E38; color:#FFFFFF;"|Big Ten regular season

Bold Italic connotes conference game

Player stats

Awards and honors
Chuck Carney was elected to the "Illini Men's Basketball All-Century Team" in 2004. Carney was also selected as the Helms Foundation College Basketball Player of the Year for his play during the 1921–22 season.

References

Illinois Fighting Illini
Illinois Fighting Illini men's basketball seasons
Illinois Fighting Illini men's b
Illinois Fighting Illini men's b